Broughton and Bretton is a community in Flintshire, Wales, comprising the villages of Broughton and Bretton and had a population of 5,974 as of the 2011 UK census. Between 1849 and 1964 it was served by Broughton & Bretton railway station.

References  

Communities in Flintshire